Music of Macedonia may refer to:
Music of North Macedonia, a sovereign state in southeastern Europe
Music of Macedonia (Greece), a region of Greece immediately south of North Macedonia

See also
Music of Southeastern Europe